Mario Rojas (born 8 September 1941) is a Bolivian footballer. He played in three matches for the Bolivia national football team in 1975. He was also part of Bolivia's squad for the 1975 Copa América tournament.

References

1941 births
Living people
Bolivian footballers
Bolivia international footballers
Place of birth missing (living people)
Association football defenders
Club Bolívar players